Metriochroa scotinopa is a moth of the family Gracillariidae. It is known from Ethiopia.

The larvae feed on Dregea schimperi. They probably mine the leaves of their host plant.

References

Endemic fauna of Ethiopia
Phyllocnistinae
Insects of Ethiopia
Moths of Africa